Search for the Perfect Girlfriend is a couples-based adult-reality show currently airing on Playboy TV.

Format
Built around the premise that only one "Perfect Girlfriend" exists, cameras follow one host as he spends the day with real couples and profiles the women in the relationships.

Six episodes were shot in various cities across the United States. The idea was that men wrote letters to Playboy TV expressing why their girlfriends are supposedly "Perfect". Then camera crews would meet each couple and find out if the nominees held up.

Two women were profiled per episode. The standard format of each show would have the host meeting each girl at her home, followed by a sit down interview with the couple. The boyfriend would then explain his girlfriend's "Perfect" qualities and a daytime activity would ensue that highlighted those qualities (e.g. kickboxing, cooking, acting classes). The final segment always featured the nominee undressing for a nude Playboy photo shoot.

Viewers were then advised to send their comments about each girl via email.

The show was hosted by comedian Rick Kunkler.

External links

2000s American reality television series
2009 American television series debuts
2009 American television series endings
Television series by Playboy Enterprises
Playboy TV original programming